The participation of India in the ABU TV Song Festival has occurred six times since the inaugural ABU TV Song Festival began in 2012. Since their début in 2015, the Indian has been organised by the national broadcaster Doordarshan (DD).

History

2015
Doordarshan is a member of the Asia-Pacific Broadcasting Union, and participated at the ABU TV Song Festival 2015 for the first time. On 13 September it was announced that the song that would represent India in Istanbul would be "The Prayer of Time", on 14 September the group Rajki Pusan Nath Sapena Kalbeliya were announced as the Indian participants. On 16 September 2015 the group Rajki Pusan Nath Sapena Kalbeliya were removed from the official list of participants provided by the ABU, it was announced on 21 September that India would be represented by Sanjeevani Bhelande with the song "Radiant Ruby".

Participation overview

See also 
 India in the ABU Radio Song Festival

References 

Countries at the ABU Song Festival